The Refined Bitumen Association is the trade association for UK bitumen companies.

History
It was formed in 1968.

Asphalt Industry Alliance
In 2000, it formed the Asphalt Industry Alliance with the Mineral Products Association, based in London. Asphalt is a mixture of bitumen and quarried mineral products, represented by both trade organisations.

Structure
Its five main members cover 95% of the UK market
 ExxonMobil Bitumen, based in Leatherhead, Surrey
 Nynas UK (a Swedish company), based in Eastham, Merseyside, Wirral, north of Ellesmere Port
 Petroplus Bitumen (formerly BP Bitumen before Petroplus bought the Coryton Refinery in 2007), based in Llandarcy, Neath Port Talbot
 Shell Bitumen, based in Wythenshawe
 Total Bitumen UK Ltd, based in Ashton-on-Ribble in Preston, Lancashire

Function
It represents the UK bitumen industry at a national level. The UK produces around 1.5 million tonnes of bitumen a year. 90% of UK bitumen is used on roads.

External links
 RBA
 Eurobitume - based in Brussels
 Asphalt Industry Alliance

Asphalt
Trade associations based in the United Kingdom
Organisations based in Harrogate
Organizations established in 1968
Oil and gas companies of the United Kingdom
Road construction